William David Hair McCall (29 February 1940 - 7 May 2021) was an Australian Anglican bishop.

McCall was born into a prominent family. His grandfather was John McCall KCMG, Agent-General for Tasmania, and his father, Theodore Bruce McCall, an Anglican bishop. He was educated at Launceston Church Grammar School, Sydney Grammar School. He studied for the priesthood at St Michael's House in Crafers, South Australia and was ordained in 1963.

He served curacies at St Alban's Griffith and St Peter's Broken Hill. He was then priest-in-charge of Barellan-Weethalle, Rector of St John's Corowa and (his last post before ordination to the episcopate) the incumbent of St George's, Goodwood. On 1 November 1987, he was consecrated a bishop, and served as Bishop of Willochra until in 2000 he was translated to the Diocese of Bunbury. 

He was married to Marion Carmel McCall, OAM, who is a pilot; their eldest son, Theo D. McCall (also a priest), is chaplain of St Peter's College, Adelaide, and an adjunct lecturer at St Barnabas' College and Charles Sturt University.

McCall died in 2021, aged 81.

References

People educated at Launceston Church Grammar School
People educated at Sydney Grammar School
Anglican bishops of Willochra
Anglican bishops of Bunbury
20th-century Anglican bishops in Australia
21st-century Anglican bishops in Australia
1940 births
2021 deaths
People from Bunbury, Western Australia